is a Japanese actor and television personality. He first began making appearances in musical theatre and stage plays in 2013 and was also the host of the intelligence training segments on the children's variety show Shimajiro no Wao!

After making minor appearances in film and television, Hashimoto gained media attention after being cast as Hajime Saitō in the Hakuoki musicals. In 2019, he began voice acting, appearing as Ivan Aleksandrovich Romano in The Royal Tutor and Yurio Mizukami in Dimension High School. After being cast as Banri Shiroishi in BanG Dream!'s male-focused multimedia project, he also portrayed the character in real life in the tie-in band, Argonavis.

Discography

Soundtrack appearances

Filmography

Theatre

Music video

Television

Film

References

External links
  

21st-century Japanese male actors
Japanese male musical theatre actors
Japanese male stage actors
Japanese male voice actors
Living people
1993 births